The Argentine general election of 1995 was held on 14 May. Voters chose both the President and their legislators and with a turnout of 82.1%.

Background
The Justicialist Party had been founded in 1945 by Juan Perón, largely on the promise of greater self-reliance, increased state ownership in the economy and a shift in national policy to benefit "the other half" of Argentine society. Taking office on Perón's ticket in 1989 amid the worst crisis in a hundred years, President Carlos Menem had begun the systematic sell-off of Argentina's array of State enterprises, which had produced nearly half the nation's goods and services. Following 18 months of very mixed results, in February 1991 Menem reached out to his Foreign Minister, Domingo Cavallo, whose experience as an economist included a brief but largely positive stint as the nation's Central Bank president in 1982. His introduction of a fixed exchange rate via his Convertibility Plan led to sharp drops in interest rates and inflation, though the sudden recovery and Cavallo's fixed exchange rate (converted to 1 peso per dollar in 1992) led to a fivefold jump in imports (far outpacing the flush growth in demand). A wave of layoffs after 1992 created a tense labor climate often worsened by the flamboyant Menem, who  also diluted basic labor laws, leading to less overtime pay and increasing unemployment and underemployment. Private-sector lay-offs, dismissed as a natural consequence of recovering productivity (which had not risen in 20 years), added to mounting state enterprise and government layoffs, leading to a rise in unemployment from 7% in 1992 to 12% by 1994 (after GDP had leapt by a third in just four years).  In this policy irony lay the Justicialists' greatest weakness ahead of the 1995 election.

The election itself created yet another unexpected turn. Barred from immediate reelection by the 1853 Argentine Constitution, President Menem reached out to his predecessor and head of the embattled centrist Radical Civic Union (UCR), Raúl Alfonsín. Meeting at the presidential residence in Olivos in November 1993 to negotiate an extensive amendment of the Constitution, the two leaders came to an agreement of mutual benefit: Alfonsín obtained the direct election of the mayor of (UCR-leaning) Buenos Aires (depriving the presidency of a right held since 1880 to appoint its mayor) and an expansion in the Argentine Senate from 48 to 72 members (3 per province), which would assure the runner-up (presumably the UCR) the third seat; Menem, in return, secured his right to run for reelection.

Both men faced dissension in their parties' ranks after the 1994 reform of the Argentine Constitution was unveiled in August. Alfonsín's candidate in the UCR primaries, Río Negro Province Governor Horacio Massaccesi, defeated Federico Storani and Rodolfo Terragno for the nomination over their opposition to the Olivos Pact. Menem, in turn, had lost a number of Congressmen from his party after Carlos Álvarez led a center-left splinter group in revolt over Menem's privatizations and unchecked corruption. His Frente Grande had become influential after merging with fellow ex-Peronist José Octavio Bordón in 1994, ahead of the May 14, 1995, election date. Bordón, a popular Mendoza Province Senator was a centrist who also lent the leftist Álvarez, whose strength was in Buenos Aires, appeal in Argentina's hinterland (which had benefited least from the 1991-94 boom). They combined forces to create the FREPASO, adding Argentina's struggling Socialists.

The new constitutional rules governing elections provided opportunities for parties stuck in 2nd or 3rd place in the polls, as the Frepaso and UCR were, respectively. Bypassing the previous electoral college system, a victory by direct proportional voting could be achieved by either through a run-off election (in case no candidate obtained a clear majority). The Justicialists enjoyed a clear advantage, given polls and their control of both chambers of Congress; but cracks began to develop as 1994 drew to a close. Local prosperity, the guarantor of Menem's presumptive victory, was shaken by the Mexican peso crisis in December. Dependent on foreign investment to maintain its central bank reserves (which fell by US$6 billion in days), its sudden scarcity led to a wave of capital flight out of Buenos Aires' growing banks and to an unforeseen recession. Concurrent revelations of gross corruption surrounding the purchase of IBM computers for the antiquated National Bank of Argentina (the nation's largest), further added to the opposition's hopes that a runoff might still be needed in May.

Between them, the Frepaso enjoyed the advantage. Sporting charismatic leadership, they hoped to displace the UCR (Argentina's oldest existing party) from its role as the Peronists' chief opposition. The UCR had been badly tarnished by President Raúl Alfonsín's chaotic 1983-89 term, though its candidate, Río Negro Province Governor Horacio Massaccesi, had earned international renown in 1991 for storming a local National Bank branch in search of needed funds being retained by the federal government for what seemed to be political reasons. The UCR, moreover, still had its name recognition and organized, if frayed political machinery, controlled by Alfonsín and popular Córdoba Province Governor Eduardo Angeloz.  As election day drew near, analysts debated not only the possibility of a runoff, but also which of the two opposition parties would face Menem in such a case.

Ultimately, corruption and the sudden recession were not enough to keep the unflappable Menem from a first-round victory. The big tent Justicialist Party, allied in many districts to local parties, formed an electoral front which obtained almost half of the total vote. The Frepaso garnered nearly 30%, and though their hopes for a runoff were stymied, this was considered a very good result for a party assembled only the previous year. Frepaso, however, came ahead in the presidential race only in two districts: Santa Fe Province and the city of Buenos Aires. The UCR, a major political force in Argentina since the beginning of the 20th century, came in third with only 17% of the vote.

All provinces except Corrientes also elected governors during 1995; several but not all provinces conducted their elections on the same date as the national one. A number of municipalities elected legislative officials (concejales) and in some cases also a mayor. The Justicialists obtained 14 of the 23 governorships and the UCR, 5. Among Argentina's larger cities, only Bahía Blanca and Mar del Plata kept a UCR mayor (though Buenos Aires would elect one in 1996).

The legislative elections, where half the seats in the Argentine Chamber of Deputies were contested, saw the Justicialists obtain a large majority (more votes that its two closest opponents combined), losing in only 5 districts out of 24; of the 130 seats in play, the secured 68, the UCR, 28 seats, and Frepaso obtained 20 seats. The UCR lost 15 and, on a district basis, they did not get the majority vote in any district. The Frepaso won in the city of Buenos Aires and picked up 12 seats. Local parties won in two districts (Salta Province and Neuquén Province). The newly expanded Argentine Senate, as Menem and Alfonsín had intended, benefited both parties.

Candidates for president 

Justicialist Party (populist): President Carlos Menem of La Rioja Province.
FrePaSo (social democrat): Former Governor José Octavio Bordón of Mendoza Province.
Radical Civic Union (socio-liberal): Governor Horacio Massaccesi of Río Negro Province.

Results

President

Chamber of Deputies

Results by province

Governors

Notes

References

1995
1995 elections in Argentina
1995 in Argentina
Presidency of Carlos Menem
1995